Vine Hill is a census-designated place (CDP) in Contra Costa County, California, United States. The population was 3,761 at the 2010 census.

Geography

Demographics

2010
The 2010 United States Census reported that Vine Hill had a population of 3,761. The racial makeup of Vine Hill was 2,568 (68.3%) White, 111 (3.0%) African American, 33 (0.9%) Native American, 196 (5.2%) Asian, 35 (0.9%) Pacific Islander, 561 (14.9%) from other races, and 257 (6.8%) from two or more races. Hispanic or Latino of any race were 1,169 persons (31.1%).

The Census reported that 98.9% of the population lived in households and 1.1% lived in non-institutionalized group quarters.

There were 1,264 households, out of which 509 (40.3%) had children under the age of 18 living in them, 630 (49.8%) were opposite-sex married couples living together, 192 (15.2%) had a female householder with no husband present, 96 (7.6%) had a male householder with no wife present.  There were 115 (9.1%) unmarried opposite-sex partnerships, and 8 (0.6%) same-sex married couples or partnerships. 237 households (18.8%) were made up of individuals, and 71 (5.6%) had someone living alone who was 65 years of age or older. The average household size was 2.94.  There were 918 families (72.6% of all households); the average family size was 3.30.

The population was spread out, with 907 people (24.1%) under the age of 18, 345 people (9.2%) aged 18 to 24, 1,192 people (31.7%) aged 25 to 44, 984 people (26.2%) aged 45 to 64, and 333 people (8.9%) who were 65 years of age or older.  The median age was 35.1 years. For every 100 females, there were 103.2 males.  For every 100 females age 18 and over, there were 104.7 males.

The homeowner vacancy rate was 3.4%; the rental vacancy rate was 5.7%.  2,382 people (63.3% of the population) lived in owner-occupied housing units and 1,337 people (35.5%) lived in rental housing units.

2000
As of the census of 2000, there were 3,260 people, 1,144 households, and 814 families residing in the CDP. The racial makeup of the CDP was 75.09% White, 2.24% Black or African American, 1.72% Native American, 2.27% Asian, 0.18% Pacific Islander, 11.99% from other races, and 6.50% from two or more races.  24.14% of the population were Hispanic or Latino of any race.

There were 1,144 households, out of which 36.3% had children under the age of 18 living with them, 49.0% were married couples living together, 15.6% had a female householder with no husband present, and 28.8% were non-families. 20.6% of all households were made up of individuals, and 4.8% had someone living alone who was 65 years of age or older.  The average household size was 2.83 and the average family size was 3.25.

In the CDP, the population was spread out, with 26.9% under the age of 18, 9.2% from 18 to 24, 33.1% from 25 to 44, 22.9% from 45 to 64, and 7.9% who were 65 years of age or older.  The median age was 34 years. For every 100 females, there were 102.7 males.  For every 100 females age 18 and over, there were 102.9 males.

The median income for a household in the CDP was $48,125, and the median income for a family was $53,750. Males had a median income of $38,869 versus $31,875 for females. The per capita income for the CDP was $17,985.  About 4.6% of families and 6.6% of the population were below the poverty line, including 5.6% of those under age 18 and 9.6% of those age 65 or over.

Education
Most of Vine Hill is in the Martinez Unified School District, while a portion is in the Mount Diablo Unified School District.

References

Census-designated places in Contra Costa County, California
Census-designated places in California